The International Doctorate in Translation Studies (ID-TS) is a worldwide network of doctoral Translation Studies programs and doctoral programs that include a Translation Studies component.

History
The International Doctorate in Translation Studies was initiated by the European Society for Translation Studies (EST) and organized by the TS-Doc working group and the ID-TS committee.

It was officially launched in Vienna on September 19, 2017.

Aims
The International Doctorate in Translation Studies seeks to promote doctoral programs all over the world based on the conviction that they are a major means of advancing scholarship in the discipline. Translation research is regarded as a broad field encompassing translation, interpreting, audiovisual translation, localization and adaptation.

The network's agenda appears on its Foundation Document. The document outlines the objectives of a doctoral program in Translation Studies and the activities required so that students in these programs can acquire the necessary competences.  Its aims include the following: promoting the cooperation between existing doctoral programs;  developing a database of online course materials such as model syllabi, presentations and video lectures; providing training for supervisors; compiling a list of translation scholars willing to supervise and co-supervise PhDs in their fields of expertise; facilitating joint doctorates, especially those involving different countries; assisting students whose research work necessitates travelling to other countries; organizing ID-TS students' conferences; tightening the collaboration with the industry and governmental and non-governmental institutions; raising external funding for the activities of the network.

Member Institutions
In 2018, there are 14 members which represent doctoral programs from 11 countries:  Aston University (Britain), Bar-Ilan University (Israel), Boğaziçi University (Turkey), Charles University – Prague (Czech Republic), Jagiellonian University – Krakow (Poland), KU Leuven (Belgium), University of Antwerp (Belgium), University of Bologna (Forlì, Italy), University of Geneva (Switzerland), University of Leeds (Britain), University of Ljubljana (Slovenia), University of Tampere (Finland), University of Turku (Finland), University of Vienna (Austria). New members are accepted tri-annually based on submitting an application dossier which testifies to the quality of their programs.

See also
 European Society for Translation Studies
 Translation Studies

References

External links
 
 Foundation Document
 Application Dossier

Translation studies
Translation associations
Organizations established in 2017
Translation organizations